is a train station on the Kyoto Municipal Subway Karasuma Line in Nakagyo-ku, Kyoto, Japan.

Lines 

 (Station Number: K07)

Layout 
The station is located beneath the intersection of Marutamachi-dōri and Karasuma-dōri (National Highway Route 367), and features a single island platform.

Turnstiles are staffed at the North gate, while they are unstaffed at the South gate.
Staffed turnstiles are towards exits 1–4, unstaffed turnstiles are towards exits 6 and 7, while exit 5 is in the very middle.

Surroundings 
north-east
Kyoto Imperial Palace
Kyoto District Court, Kyoto Summary Court
north-west
Kyoto Prefectural Government Office
Kyoto Prefectural Police
Kyoto Architectural College
Heian Jogakuin University, St. Agnes' Junior and Senior High School
Kyoto Broadcasting System Co., Ltd.
Japan Red Cross Society Kyoto Daini Hospital
south-east
The Kyoto Shimbun

Station History 
 May 29, 1981 - Station opening.
 14–16 November 2005 - Due to U.S. President George W. Bush's visit, station lockers and exit #1 are closed.
 1 April 2007 - PiTaPa use begins.

References

External links 
 駅施設 京都市営地下鉄烏丸線 丸太町駅

Railway stations in Kyoto Prefecture
Railway stations in Japan opened in 1981